Albani may refer to:

People
 Albani family, an aristocratic Roman family of Albanian origin
 Albani, or Albanoi, an Illyrian tribe

People with the surname

Born before 1900
 Alessandro Albani (1692–1779), Italian Cardinal and antiquities collector
 Annibale Albani (1682–1751), Italian Cardinal
 Dame Emma Albani (1847–1930), Canadian soprano singer
 Francesco Albani (1578–1660), Italian painter
 Gian Francesco Albani (1720–1803), Italian Cardinal
 Gian Girolamo Albani (1509–1591), Italian Cardinal
 Giovanni Battista Albani (died 1588), Roman Catholic prelate who served as Patriarch of Alexandria
 Giuseppe Albani (1750–1834), Italian Cardinal
 Fra' Ludovico Chigi Albani della Rovere (1866–1951), 76th Prince and Grand Master of the Sovereign Military Order of Malta
 Marcella Albani (1899–1959), Italian actress
 Mathias Albani (1621-1673), violin maker from Botzen (now Bolzano in South Tyrol)
 Pope Clement XI (1649–1721), born Giovanni Francesco Albani

Born after 1900
 Giuseppe Albani (footballer) (born 1921), Italian footballer
 Giorgio Albani (1929–2015), Italian racing cyclist
 Luigi Albani (born 1928), Italian footballer
 Marcello Albani (1905–1980), American-born Italian filmmaker
 Muhammad Nasiruddin al-Albani (1914–1999), Albanian Islamic scholar
 Nicola Albani (born 1981), San Marinese footballer
 Romano Albani (1945–2014), Italian cinematographer
 Stephan Albani (born 1968), German physicist and politician

Other uses
 Albani Brewery, in Odense, Denmark
 Colli Albani (Rome Metro), station on the Rome Metro, Line A
 Villa Albani, villa in Rome
 Alban Hills, hills in Rome also known as Colli Albani

See also
Albini
Albany (disambiguation)
Albano (disambiguation)
Albanus (disambiguation)
Albania (disambiguation)
Albanian (disambiguation)
Albanians (disambiguation)

Latin-language surnames
Italian-language surnames